Crawford Hugh "Sammy" Downs (October 1, 1911 – May 14, 1985) was an American politician. He served as a Democratic member of the Louisiana House of Representatives. Downs also served as a member of the Louisiana State Senate.

Life and career
Davis was born in Effie, Louisiana, the son of Callie McCann and U. T. Downs, a mayor and sheriff. He attended Louisiana Christian University, where he earned his bachelor's degree in 1932. He then attended Louisiana State University, where he earned his law and master's degree.  Downs taught athletics at the Glenmora High School, and was the head teacher at the Cheneyville High School.

In 1944, Downs was elected to the Louisiana House of Representatives, serving until 1948. In that year, Downs was elected to the Louisiana State Senate, succeeding Grove Stafford. In 1952, Downs was succeeded by John R. Hunter Jr. He then succeeded Hunter  in 1956. Downs was succeeded by Cecil R. Blair in 1960. He was later the executive counsel for the 49th Governor of Louisiana, John McKeithen. Downs was the chairperson of the Louisiana Democratic Party. In 1964 was one of the master of ceremonies at John McKeithen's inauguration.

According to Life magazine, McKeithen described Downs as "the only Mafia link I know of in my administration". Davis was involved iin 1973 in a case involving the Shoup Voting Machine Corporation which resulted in a hung jury.

Downs died in May 1985 at the Rapides General Hospital in Alexandria, Louisiana, at the age of 73. He was buried in Greenwood Memorial Park.

References 

1911 births
1985 deaths
Politicians from Alexandria, Louisiana
Democratic Party Louisiana state senators
Democratic Party members of the Louisiana House of Representatives
20th-century American politicians
Burials in Louisiana
Louisiana lawyers
American school principals
Louisiana Christian University alumni
Louisiana State University alumni
20th-century American educators
Schoolteachers from Louisiana